Eduardo Parra (Eduardo Parra Pizarro?) (July 24, 1943, in Los Andes, Chile) is a member of the Chilean rock fusion band Los Jaivas.  He is the oldest of the Parra brothers (plus Claudio and Gabriel). Eduardo plays the keyboards and some percussion instruments.

Poetry
He has written several poetry books, including:

La Puerta Giratoria.Ediciones Rivera Scott. 1968
Pequeño contratiempo justo a final de siglo. Ediciones Rumbos. 1996
Cuentos de Paciencia-Ficción. Editorial Efímera. 1987
Ruego por ti, Valparáiso. Editorial Contemporánea S.A.
La isla de la dulzura. Ediciones Los Jaivas. Sony BMG.

References

1943 births
Living people
People from Los Andes Province, Chile
Chilean folk singers
20th-century Chilean male singers
Chilean pianists
Chilean male poets
Male pianists
21st-century pianists
20th-century Chilean male artists